Soul on Jazz  is an album by Philip Bailey which was released in April 2002 on Heads Up International Records. The album rose to No. 45 on the Billboard Jazz Albums chart.

Overview
On the album, Bailey covered Thelonious Monk's "Ruby, My Dear", Earth, Wind & Fire's "Keep Your Head to the Sky",  Joe Zawinul's "Mercy, Mercy, Mercy", Chick Corea's Sometime Ago, Les McCann's "Compared to What" and Herbie Hancock's "Tell Me a Bedtime Story".

Track listing

Personnel

Musicians 
 Philip Bailey – lead vocals, handclaps (1), timbales (3), arrangements (5, 6, 8), backing vocals (6)
 Scott Kinsey – keyboards (1, 4, 5, 9, 11), handclaps (1), arrangements (1, 5, 9, 11), orchestration (4), programming (5, 11), acoustic piano (9), electric piano (10)
 Myron McKinley – acoustic piano (2, 3, 4, 6, 7), keyboards (2, 3, 6, 7, 8), melodica (2, 6), arrangements (2, 3, 6, 7, 8)
 DJ Smash – programming (5)
 Mike Campbell – guitar (1-5, 7, 8, 9, 11) [Not the same Mike Campbell that played with Tom Petty].
 Alan Burroughs – acoustic guitar (2)
 John Hart – lead guitar (9, 11), guitar (10)
 David Dyson – bass guitar (2, 3, 6, 7)
 Ira Coleman – acoustic bass (4, 5, 8-11)
 Billy Kilson – drums 
 Don Alias – congas (1-4, 8, 9, 10), percussion (1, 2, 4, 6, 8, 9, 10), handclaps (1)
 Dave Love – handclaps (1)
 Daniel de los Reyes – congas (7)
 Bob Belden – soprano saxophone (1), handclaps (1), arrangements (4, 10)
 Lou Marini – alto saxophone (3, 7)
 Ronnie Cuber – baritone saxophone (3)
 Scott Wendholt – trumpet (1, 4)
 Billy Baker – backing vocals (1, 5)
 Charmaine Cousins – backing vocals (1, 2, 3, 5-8, 11)  
 David Whitworth – backing vocals (1, 2, 5, 6, 11), BGV arrangements (3, 7, 8)
 Don Corey Washington – backing vocals (2, 3, 7, 8, 11)
 Robert Brookins – backing vocals (6)

Production 
 Producers – Philip Bailey (all tracks); Bob Belden and Scott Kinsey (Tracks 1, 4, 5, 9, 10 & 11); Myron McKinley (Tracks 2, 3, 6, 7 & 8).
 Executive Producer – Dave Love 
 Engineered and Mixed by Robert Friedrich
 Assistant Engineers – Mark Fraunfelder and Tim Stritmater
 Recorded at Bennett Studios (Englewood, NJ).
 BGV’s recorded by David Kowlaski
 Technical Engineer – Andy Ackland
 Mix Assistant – Tim Lauber
 Mixed at O’Henry Studios (Burbank, CA).
 Mastered by Louis F. Hemsey 
 Art Direction and Design – Robert Hoffman
 Cover Photo – Peter Figen
 Inner Sleeve Photos – Andrew Lepley

References

2002 albums
Philip Bailey albums
Heads Up International albums
Albums produced by Philip Bailey